Cameraria castaneaeella is a moth of the family Gracillariidae. It is known from the United States (Connecticut, Kentucky, Ohio, Maine and New York).

The wingspan is 6-7.5 mm.

The larvae feed on Castanea species (including Castanea dentata and Castanea sativa) and Quercus species (including Quercus ilicifolia). They mine the leaves of their host plant. The mine has the form of an irregular yellowish blotch mine on the upperside of the leaf. The larva hibernates on a slight bed of silk beneath the folded epidermis.

References

Cameraria (moth)
Moths described in 1875

Lepidoptera of the United States
Moths of North America
Leaf miners
Taxa named by Vactor Tousey Chambers